Jonkheer Mr. Maximilien Vegelin van Claerbergen (17 August 1927 – 11 April 2011) was a Dutch diplomat and founder of Biblionef International.

Van Claerbergen was born on 17 August 1927 in Roquebrune-Cap-Martin, France. On 8 December 1978, he was appointed Ambassador of the Netherlands to Suriname. On 24 February 1980, one day before the 1980 Surinamese coup d'état, he boarded a plane to French Guiana. On 5 October 1981, he was succeeded by Joop Hoekman.

He died on 11 April 2011 in Zeist.

Sources

Nederland's Adelsboek; 96 (2011), pp. 74–75.

1927 births
2011 deaths
20th-century Dutch diplomats
Ambassadors of the Netherlands to Suriname
People from Roquebrune-Cap-Martin